Walter E. Bickford (born February 16, 1942) is an American civil engineer and politician who served in the Massachusetts House of Representatives from 1977 to 1983 and served as Commissioner of the Massachusetts Department of Fisheries and Wildlife from 1983 to 1991. In 1999 he ran in the special election for the Massachusetts Senate seat in the Middlesex and Worcester District vacated by Robert Durand. He lost in the Democratic primary to Pam Resor.

References

External links

|-

1942 births
Democratic Party members of the Massachusetts House of Representatives
People from Worcester County, Massachusetts
University of Alaska Fairbanks alumni
University of Massachusetts Amherst alumni
Wentworth Institute of Technology alumni
Living people
People from Marlborough, Massachusetts